John Wyndham (1903–1969) was a British science fiction writer.

John Wyndham may also refer to:

Sir John Wyndham (died 1573), of Orchard Wyndham
Sir John Wyndham (1558–1645), of Orchard Wyndham, English landowner involved in the defence of the West Country against the threat of Spanish invasion
John Wyndham (of Norrington), MP for Salisbury in 1681 and 1685
John Wyndham, 6th Baron Leconfield and 1st Baron Egremont (1920–1972), British peer
John Wyndham (High Sheriff), High Sheriff of Sussex
John Wyndham (cricketer), English cricketer
Max Wyndham, 2nd Baron Egremont, usually known as Max Egremont, whose full name is John Max Henry Scawen Wyndham.